Mi Gente may refer to:

"Mi Gente" (Héctor Lavoe song), 1973, also performed by Marc Anthony in 2007
"Mi Gente" (J Balvin and Willy William song), 2017
"Mi Gente", 2003 song by Kumbia Kings from the album 4
"Mi Gente", 2002 album and song by Cuban singer Lucrecia